Venezuelan electronic music producer Arca has released ten studio albums (including two under the name Nuuro), one remix album, two mixtapes, one compilation album, four DJ mixes, one box set, four extended plays (EPs), twenty-eight singles, twenty-three music videos, and ten remixes.

Albums

Studio albums

Remix albums

Mixtapes

Compilation albums

DJ mixes

Box sets

Extended plays

Singles

Guest appearances

Credits

Remixes

Videography

Music videos

Collaborative films

Notes

References

External links
 
 
 

Discographies of Venezuelan artists
Electronic music discographies